Swamp oak is a common name for several plants and may refer to:

 Casuarina glauca, also called swamp she-oak
 Casuarina cristata, native to Australia
 Quercus bicolor, native to North America
 Quercus palustris, native to North America